The Helpmann Award for Best Female Actor in a Musical is a musical award, presented by Live Performance Australia (LPA) at the annual Helpmann Awards since 2001. This is a list of winners and nominations for the Helpmann Award for Best Female Actor in a Musical.

Winners and nominees

Source:

2000s

2010s

See also
Helpmann Awards

References

External links
The official Helpmann Awards website

M